The Oahu Cemetery  is the resting place of many notable early residents of the Honolulu area. They range from missionaries and politicians to sports pioneers and philosophers. Over time it was expanded to become an area known as the Nuuanu Cemetery.

History
It was the first public cemetery in Honolulu, founded in November 1844. Due to the growth in the whaling industry, discussion had started in 1836 on the need for a new burial ground that was not associated with a specific church. The  site was purchased for $300 and $350 granted for a house. The money was raised by selling subscriptions on 59 plots of $12 each. Later another  were purchased from Gerrit P. Judd to expand in 1860. Rev. Samuel C. Damon served on the cemetery association in the early days. The first recorded burial was American sailor H. Wolley, for $2.50.

In 1906, the first public crematory in the Hawaiian Islands, designed by architect Oliver G. Traphagen opened at the cemetery.

After the attack on Pearl Harbor in 1941, all paper currency on the islands was withdrawn and replaced with Hawaii overprint notes, in case the Japanese invaded. Faced with the task of quickly destroying $200 million of cash, the crematory at the cemetery was used to burn it, instead of risking transport to the mainland. However, progress was too slow, so the larger furnace at the Aiea sugar mill was also used.

An area called the Seamen's Lot contains many unmarked graves for sailors, provided by the Honolulu Sailor's Home. Two dozen were killed by strafing in the December 7, 1941 attack.

Oahu Cemetery is located at 2162 Nuuanu Avenue, at the base of the Nuuanu Valley at coordinates . In 1863 King Kamehameha IV built the Royal Mausoleum of Hawaii across the street for the Hawaiian royal family. In Punchbowl Crater (to the south) the National Memorial Cemetery of the Pacific was founded in 1948. Just north of the Royal Mausoleum, the "Nuuanu Memorial Park" was added in 1949, with its own funeral home. In 1958 a Japanese cemetery was added on adjacent land called "Honolulu Memorial Park". In 1964, two Columbaria (buildings to store cremated remains) called the Kyoto Gardens were constructed.

One of the buildings is a replica of a Buddhist temple. They are listed on the National Register of Historic Places.

Strictly speaking, the original 1844 cemetery is called "Oahu Cemetery", although the extended area is often called "Nuuanu Cemetery" after the area.

In 1989 a funeral for Ferdinand Marcos  was planned at the mortuary, but instead the body was kept refrigerated at the Byodo-In Temple until it was flown back to the Philippines in 1993.

Notable burials
 Captain Alexander Adams (1780–1871), Scottish sea captain
 R. Alexander Anderson (1894–1995), composer
 Lorrin Andrews (1795–1868), missionary, publisher, judge
 Andrew Auld (1799–1873), Scottish shipbuilder
 Joseph Campbell (1904–1987), philosopher
 George R. Carter (1866–1933), Territorial Governor
 Alexander Cartwright (1820–1892), baseball pioneer
 John F. Colburn (1859–1920), businessman and politician
 William H. Cornwell (1843–1903), politician
 Samuel C. Damon (1815–1885), missionary
 Benjamin Dillingham (1844–1918), industrialist
 Mary Jones Dominis (1803–1889) mother of Prince Consort John Owen Dominis
 Wilhelmine Kekelaokalaninui Widemann Dowsett (1861–1929), founder of the National Women's Equal Suffrage Association of Hawai'i, the first Hawaiian suffrage organization
 Kenneth Emory (1897–1992), anthropologist
 Jean Erdman (1916–2020), dancer and choreographer
 Elizabeth P. Farrington (1898–1984), legislator
 Joseph Rider Farrington (1897–1954), publisher
 Wallace Rider Farrington (1871–1933), 6th Territorial Governor (1920–28)
 Grace Crosby Hamman (1899–1983), director of services to the blind in Hawaii, 1935–1955
 Victor S. K. Houston (1876–1959), naval officer, congressional delegate
 John Papa ʻĪʻī (1800–1870), educator, jurist
 Gerrit P. Judd (1803–1873), missionary physician, diplomat
 Lawrence M. Judd (1887–1968), Territorial Governor
 Elizabeth Kahanu Kalanianaʻole (1879–1932), Hawaiian princess by marriage
 Stanley Kennedy Sr. (1890–1968), Founder of Hawaiian Airlines
 Oren E. Long (1889–1965), Governor, Senator
 J. R. Kealoha (d. 1877), a Native Hawaiian veteran of the Civil War
 Lincoln Loy McCandless (1859–1940), industrialist, congressional delegate
 Paul Neumann (c. 1839–1901), royal lawyer and attorney general
 Arthur P. Peterson (1858–1895), lawyer and politician
 Joseph Rock (1884–1962), explorer
 Martha Root (1872–1939), Bahá'í teacher
 Ingram Stainback (1883–1961), Territorial Governor
 Lorrin A. Thurston (1858–1931), businessman, politician
 Jules Tavernier (1844–1889), painter
 Horace Worth Vaughan (1867–1922), Texas politician, Hawai'i judge
 Four British Royal Navy personnel of World War II.

Notes

 a. Some sources do not use the word "Oahu" for the crematory, but use "Nuʻuanu", and this was the only crematory listed in telephone books at the time that was on Nuuanu Avenue.

References

Further reading

External links
 
 

Cemeteries in Hawaii
Buildings and structures in Honolulu
History of Oahu
Lists of people from Hawaii
Protected areas of Oahu
1844 establishments in Hawaii
Tourist attractions in Honolulu
National Register of Historic Places in Honolulu